Cornelius Clarkson Vermeule may refer to:

Cornelius Clarkson Vermeule I (1858–1950)
Cornelius Clarkson Vermeule II (1895–1943)
Cornelius Clarkson Vermeule III (1925–2008)